European route E 123 is a Class A north-south reference European route that connects the Ural region with Central Asia, spanning .

Route 
The E 123 routes through four Asian countries:

: Chelyabinsk - Troitsk - border with Kazakhstan

: Podgorodka – Kostanai 
: Kostanai - Zapadnoye
: Zapadnoye – Esil – Derzhavinsk – Arkalyk – Zhezkazgan
: Zhezkazgan – Kyzylorda
: Kyzylorda – Shymkent
: Shymkent – Frontovoy - Border of Uzbekistan

: Border of Kazakhstan - G‘ishtko‘prik - Tashkent - Chinoz - Sirdaryo
: Sirdaryo - Xovos

 РБ15 Road: Border of Uzbekistan - Zarafshon - Istaravshan
 РБ01 Road: Istaravshan - Spitamen - Ayni - Dushanbe
 РБ09 Road: Dushanbe - Qizilqala - Bokhtar - Panji Poyon

Sher Khan Bandar
The E123 is only signed in Russia and Kazakhstan. In Russia (as well as and Kazakhstan), European route numbers are signposted on direction signs, however this is not the case in many other Asian countries.

References

External links 
 UN Economic Commission for Europe: Overall Map of E-road Network (2007)

123
E123
E123
E123
E123